Muhamad Feroz bin Baharudin (born 2 April 2000) is a Malaysian footballer who plays as a centre-back for Malaysia Super League side Johor Darul Ta'zim.

Career statistics

Club

Notes

Honours
Johor Darul Ta'zim
 Malaysia Super League: 2022
 Malaysia FA Cup: 2022
 Malaysia Cup: 2022
 Malaysia Charity Shield: 2023

Malaysia U19
 AFF U-19 Youth Championship:2018

References

2000 births
People from Johor
Living people
Malaysian footballers
Malaysia youth international footballers
Malaysia Super League players
Johor Darul Ta'zim F.C. players
Association football defenders